Chihe (池河) may refer to:

 Chi River (China), tributary of the Hanshui
 Chihe, Anhui, town in Dingyuan County
 Chihe, Shaanxi, town in Shiquan County
Chihe Station, on the Yangpingguan–Ankang Railway in Chihe, Shaanxi